Paloma is a Spanish female given name, derived from Latin "palumbus, which means "dove", a symbol of peace.  The name also can be understood as the Holy Spirit symbolized in this bird. Palomma, using double "m, comes from a Neapolitan dialect, made famous in the song "Palomma 'e notte written by Di Giacomo and Buongiovanni in 1906.

In  Southern Italy, "La Festa della Palomma (Feast of Palomma) is celebrated at Easter at the Chiesa della Madonna della Nova (Our Lady of Nova's Church), Ostuni, Puglia. In Spain, the "Virgen de la Paloma de Madrid feast day is celebrated on August 15.

Paloma is a common name in Italy and Spain.

Paloma is made reference to in an Al Stewart song, Song On The Radio from the album Time Passages.  Song line:"All your friends call you Lily Paloma but, that's not the way that you are.  It's a bit of a gentle misnomer for a shooting star."

Notable people named Paloma

Given name 

 Paloma Baeza, British actress
 Paloma Berganza, Spanish singer
 Paloma Bloyd, American actress and model
 Paloma del Río, Spanish journalist
 Paloma Efron, Argentine journalist
 Paloma Faith, British singer and actress
 Paloma García Ovejero, Spanish journalist
 Paloma Herrera, Argentine ballet dancer
 Paloma Kwiatkowski, Canadian actress
 Paloma McLardy, Spanish drummer
 Paloma O'Shea, Spanish pianist
 Paloma Pedrero, Spanish actress 
 Paloma Picasso, French and Spanish designer and businesswoman
 Paloma Pinault, daughter of François-Henri Pinault and Salma Hayek
 Paloma Rao, Indian actress
 Paloma San Basilio, Spanish singer
 Paloma Stoecker, British singer
 Paloma Tortajada, Spanish broadcaster and journalist
 Paloma Weisz, German contemporary artist 
 Paloma Young, American designer
 Paloma Mami, Chilean-American singer

Surname 
 Pepsi Paloma (1966–1985), Filipino-American dancer and actress

Stage Name 
 Paloma (drag queen) Drag Queen, winner of Drag Race France

See also

References

Italian feminine given names
Latin feminine given names
Hungarian feminine given names
Spanish feminine given names
Croatian feminine given names
Given names derived from birds